The Sobaipuri were one of many indigenous groups occupying Sonora and what is now Arizona at the time Europeans first entered the American Southwest. They were a Piman or O'odham group who occupied southern Arizona and northern Sonora (the Pimería Alta) in the 15th–19th centuries. They were a subgroup of the O'odham or Pima, surviving members of which include the residents of San Xavier del Bac which is now part of the Tohono O'odham Nation and the Akimel O'odham.

Debate sometimes still arises as to whether the Sobaipuri and other O'odham groups are related to the prehistoric Hohokam who occupied a portion of the same geographic area and were present until about the 15th century. This question is sometimes phrased as the "Hohokam-Pima" or "Salado-Pima continuum", a phraseology that questions whether there is a connection between the prehistoric Hohokam and the first historic groups cited in the area. A key piece of the puzzle has recently been found when it was discovered that there was Sobaipuri (O'odham) present in the late prehistoric period (Seymour 2007a, 2011a, 2011b, 2014). Chronometric dates from multiple sites on the San Pedro and Santa Cruz rivers have produced evidence of Sobaipuri occupation in the 14th century (Seymour 2007, 2008, 2011a, 2011b; www.sobaipuri.com) and some even earlier, perhaps as early as the 13th century. The position is no longer defensible that no one was present after 1400 CE  and that there was a substantial population decline in the prehistoric period (Seymour 2007c,d, 2011a, 2011b). Traditional stories help confirm the idea that there was likely a clash between the newly arriving O'odham, including the Sobaipuri-O'odham and the extant groups including the Hohokam and Western Puebloan groups. The issue of a continuum is implausible because archaeological and oral histories demonstrate  that the local residents intermixed with and became O'odham.

Archaeology and history
The Sobaipuri were present when the first Europeans visited the area in the middle 16th century, thereby playing an important role in European contact and later the European colonization of Arizona. Marcos de Niza probably encountered this group along the San Pedro River in southeastern Arizona in 1539, although when Francisco Vázquez de Coronado followed less than a year later his party of explorers seems to have turned before reaching the Sobaipuri settlements (Seymour 2009a, 2011a). When Father Eusebio Kino first arrived in the area in 1691 he was greeted by leaders of this group. Headmen from San Cayetano del Tumacácori and perhaps other villages had come to Saric, Mexico from the north to ask that Kino visit them. Kino traveled north along the Santa Cruz River to San Cayetano de Tumacácori (later moved to the modern location of Tumacácori National Historical Park and renamed), where he found three native-made structures that had been constructed specially for him: a house, a kitchen, and one for saying mass (Bolton 1948). This visit to this first of the Spanish missions in the Sonoran Desert north of the current international border made this native Sobaipuri settlement the first mission in southern Arizona, or the first Jesuit mission in Arizona, but, contrary to popular notions, not the first mission in Arizona. This original native Sobaipuri settlement of San Cayetano del Tumacácori has been located archaeologically on the east side of the river (as shown on Kino's historic maps), providing evidence of a densely packed, well-planned, long-occupied village (Seymour 2007a, 2011a).

Kino then stopped by Guevavi (later referred to as Mission Los Santos Ángeles de Guevavi),  which is located to the south along the Santa Cruz River. Here he later (1701) established a church which he ordered whitewashed. The location of this native settlement and this formal church has been identified (Seymour 1993, 1997, 2008b, 2011a). This native settlement later became the head mission for this region.

The Sobaipuris were initially friendly with their neighbors, including the Apache, Jocome, and Jano (Seymour 2007b, 2008a). They traded with one another and they were cited sometimes raiding together. They even intermarried, probably creating the unique character of the Sobaipuri. Later they sided with the Europeans which stressed their relationship with the unconverted tribes, because Sobaipuris then went into battle against the others.

Archaeological research
The Sobaipuri are one of the most-studied protohistoric (or late prehistoric and early historic) groups in southern Arizona, although this is not saying much as the protohistoric (late prehistoric and early historic) are less studied than most other time periods, especially in this area. The accompanying list of references shows the upsurge of research in this group by archaeologists in the past 30 years.

Prior to this most of the research was conducted by historians. The first archaeological work was initiated by Charles C. Di Peso (1953, 1956) of the Amerind Foundation who established a program designed to understand the transition from prehistory to history. Although most of his conclusions about sites visited by Father Eusebio Kino have been discredited, Di Peso is recognized as a true scholar and he did define the first archaeological Sobaipuri site, making key contributions to the field, some of which are only recently being recognized. The other sites he thought might be Sobaipuri turned out to be late prehistoric sites representing Puebloan and other culture groups or the remnants of a later Spanish fort Santa Cruz de Terrenate.

Archaeologist Deni Seymour has studied the Sobaipuri for 30 years, revisiting some of the issues raised by Di Peso. On the San Pedro, Santa Cruz, and tributary drainages of Sonoita creek, Babocomari, and Aravaipi Seymour has documented more than 80 archaeological sites occupied by the Sobaipuri (Seymour 1989, 1990, 1993a). She has mapped portions of their extensive irrigation systems and noted how their agriculture-based villages drifted along the river margins as groups grew and splintered through time (Seymour 1990, 1993, 1997, 2003, 2011a, 2011b, 2013). Excavations on several Sobaipuri sites have led her to revise conclusions that have arisen from use of the documentary record alone.

In the early 1980s, archaeologist Bruce Masse (1981) excavated Sobaipuri sites on the lower (northern) San Pedro River, revising many of Di Peso's original perspectives and summarizing the state of knowledge about this group to that date.

Only a few residential sites have been found away from the rivers. Archaeologist Bruce Huckell (1994) documented three archaeological sites in the shadow of the Santa Rita Mountains north of Sonoita, Arizona. These sites were probably used seasonally for hunting and gathering or possibly as refuge sites to escape Spanish, or possibly Apache, domination.

See also 
 Tohono 'Odham
 Akimel O'odham (Pima People)
 Hia C-eḍ O'odham
 Ak-Chin O'odham
 Hohokam
 Apache
 Puebloans

References

 Bolton, Herbert E., 1948 Kino's Historical Memoir of Pimeria Alta. Berkeley and Los Angeles: University of California Press.
 Bolton, Herbert E., 1960 [1936] Rim of Christendom:  A Biography of Eusebio Francisco Kino Pacific Coast Pioneer.  Russell & Russell, New York.
 Brew, Susan A., and Bruce B. Huckell, 1987 "A protohistoric Piman burial and a consideration of Piman burial practices." The Kiva 52(3):163–191.
 Burrus, E. J., 1965 Kino and the Cartography of Northwestern New Spain.  Tucson, AZ:  Arizona Pioneers' Historical Society.
 Burrus, E. J., 1971a "Kino and Manje:  Explorers of Sonora and Arizona."  In Sources and Studies for the History of the Americas, Vol. 10.  Rome and St. Louis:  Jesuit Historical Institute.
 Di Peso, Charles, 1953 The Sobaipuri Indians of the Upper San Pedro River Valley, Southwestern  Arizona.  Dragoon, AZ:  Amerind Foundation Publication No. 6.
 Di Peso, Charles, 1956 The Upper Pima of San Cayetano del Tumacacori:  An Archaeohistorical Reconstruction of the Ootam of Pimeria Alta.  The Amerind Foundation, Inc. Dragoon, Arizona.
 Doyel, D. E., 1977 "Excavations in the Middle Santa Cruz River Valley, Southeastern Arizona".  Contribution to Highway Salvage Archaeology in Arizona, Number 44.  Arizona State Museum, University of Arizona, Tucson.
 Hoover, J.W., 1935 "Generic Descent of the Papago Villages." American Anthropologist 37(2):257–264.
 Huckell, Bruce B., 1984 "Sobaipuri Sites in the Rosemont Area."  Chapter 3 in Miscellaneous Archaeological Studies in the Anamax-Rosemont Land Exchange Area, edited by M.D. Tagg, R.G. Ervin, B.B. Huckell.  Tucson, AZ:  Arizona State Museum Archaeological Series 147(4) Tucson, pp. 107–130.
 Karns, H. J., 1954 Luz de Tierra Incognita. Tucson, AZ: Arizona Silhouettes.
 Kessell, John L., 1970 Mission of Sorrow:  Jesuit Guevavi and the Pimas, 1691–1767.  Tucson, AZ:  University of Arizona Press.
 Masse, W. Bruce, 1981 "A Reappraisal of the Protohistoric Sobaipuri Indians of Southeastern Arizona."  In The Protohistoric Period in the North American Southwest, A.D. 1450–1700.  David R. Wilcox and W. Bruce Masse, editors. Tempe, AZ:  Arizona State University Anthropological Research Papers No. 24, pp. 28–56.
 Robinson, William J., 1976 "Mission Guevavi: Excavations in the Convento." The Kiva 42(2):135–175.
 Seymour, Deni J., 1989 "The Dynamics of Sobaipuri Settlement in the Eastern Pimeria Alta." Journal of the Southwest 31(2):205–222.
 Seymour, Deni J., 1990 "Sobaipuri-Pima Settlement Along the Upper San Pedro River: A Thematic Survey Between Fairbank and Aravaipa Canyon. Report for the Bureau of Land Management." On file at the Arizona State Museum.
 Seymour, Deni J., 1993a "Piman Settlement Survey in the Middle Santa Cruz River Valley, Santa Cruz County, Arizona." Report submitted to Arizona State Parks in fulfillment of survey and planning grant contract requirements.
 Seymour, Deni J., 1993b "In Search of the Sobaipuri Pima:  Archaeology of the Plain and Subtle." Archaeology in Tucson. Newsletter of the Center for Desert Archaeology. Vol. 7, No. 1, pp. 1–4.
 Seymour, Deni J., 1997 "Finding History in the Archaeological Record; The Upper Piman Settlement of Guevavi." Kiva 62(3):245–260.
 Seymour, Deni J., 2003 "Sobaipuri-Pima Occupation in the Upper San Pedro Valley: San Pablo de Quiburi." New Mexico Historical Review 78(2):147–166.
 Seymour, Deni J., 2007a "A Syndetic Approach to Identification of the Historic Mission Site of San Cayetano Del Tumacácori." International Journal of Historical Archaeology, Vol. 11(3):269–296.
 Seymour, Deni J., 2007b "Delicate Diplomacy on a Restless Frontier: Seventeenth century Sobaipuri Social and Economic Relations in Northwestern New Spain, Part I." New Mexico Historical Review, 82(4):469–499.
 Seymour, Deni J., 2007c "An Archaeological Perspective on the Hohokam-Pima Continuum." Old Pueblo Archaeology Bulletin No. 51, December 2007:1-7.
 Seymour, Deni J., 2007e  "Sexually Based War Crimes or Structured Conflict Strategies: An Archaeological Example from the American Southwest." In Texas and Points West: Papers in Honor of John A. Hedrick and Carol P. Hedrick, edited by Regge N. Wiseman, Thomas C. O’Laughlin, and Cordelia T. Snow, pp. 117–134. Papers of the Archaeological Society of New Mexico No. 33. Archaeological Society of New Mexico, Albuquerque.
 Seymour, Deni J., 2008a  "Delicate Diplomacy on a Restless Frontier: Seventeenth century Sobaipuri Social and Economic Relations in Northwestern New Spain, Part II." New Mexico Historical Review, Volume 83, No. 2:171–199
 Seymour, Deni J., 2008b  "Apache Plain and Other Plainwares on Apache Sites in the Southern Southwest." In Serendipity: Papers in Honor of Frances Joan Mathien, edited by R.N. Wiseman, T.C O'Laughlin, C.T. Snow and C. Travis, pp. 163–186. Papers of the Archaeological Society of New Mexico No. 34. Archaeological Society of New Mexico, Albuquerque.
 Seymour, Deni J., 2009a "Evaluating Eyewitness Accounts of Native Peoples Along the Coronado Trail From the International Border to Cibola." New Mexico Historical Review 84(3):399–435.
 Seymour, Deni J., 2009b "Beyond Married, Buried, And Baptized: Exposing Historical Discontinuities in an Engendered Sobaípuri-O’odham Household." Chapter 12 Engendering Households in the Prehistoric Southwest, edited by Barbara Roth, pp. 229–259. University of Arizona Press, Tucson.  
 Seymour, Deni J., 2009c "Father Kino’s 'Neat Little House and Church' at Guevavi." Journal of the Southwest 51(2):285–316.
 Seymour, Deni J., 2009d "Distinctive Places, Suitable Spaces: Conceptualizing Mobile Group Occupational Duration and Landscape Use." International Journal of Historical Archaeology 13(3): 255–281.
 Seymour, Deni J., 2011a Where the Earth and Sky are Sewn Together: Sobaípuri-O’odham Contexts of Contact and Colonialism. University of Utah Press: Salt Lake City, 2011. 
 Seymour, Deni J., 2011b Dating the Sobaípuri: A Case Study in Chronology Building and Archaeological Interpretation. Old Pueblo Archaeology Bulletin 67:1–13.
 Seymour, Deni J., 2011c 1762 on the San Pedro: Reevaluating Sobaípuri Abandonment and New Apache Raiding Corridors. The Journal of Arizona History 52(2):169–188.
 Seymour, Deni J., 2012 Santa Cruz River: The Origin of a Place Name. Journal of Arizona History 53(1):81–88.
 Seymour, Deni J., 2013 The Sobaipuri-O’odham Presence at Guevavi Mission. Arizona Archaeological Council Newsletter 37(4):7–15.
 Seymour, Deni J., 2014 A Fateful Day in 1698: The Remarkable Sobaípuri-O’odham Victory Over the Enemies of the Sonoran Province. University of Utah Press, Salt Lake City.
 Seymour, Deni J., 2015 Behavioral Assessment of a Pompeii-Like Event and It's Battlefield Signature. Chapter Chapter 2 in Explorations in Behavioral Archaeology, edited by William H. Walker and James M. Skibo. University of Utah Press, Salt Lake City.
 Seymour, Deni J., 2016 Perceiving the Protohistoric: When Weak Signatures Represent the Strongest Cases. Chapter in The Strong Case Approach in Behavioral Archaeology, edited by M.B. Schiffer, C.R. Riggs, and J.J. Reid. University of Utah Press, Salt Lake City.

Pre-Columbian cultures
Southwest tribes
Indigenous peoples in Mexico
Native American tribes in Arizona
Native American history of Arizona
Oasisamerica cultures
Archaeological sites in Arizona
Archaeology of Mexico
Colonial Mexico